Emmanuelle Zoldan (born 18 June 1977) is a French opera singer, best known for her work as a session musician in heavy metal bands as Sirenia, Trail of Tears and Turisas, among others. She is currently the vocalist of Sirenia.

Career 
Zoldan is an operatic mezzo-soprano singer.
She has combined her musical activities in the most diverse genres, singing in several operas in France for many years and worked simultaneously with some heavy metal bands and other personal projects. Two of her most notable appearances were in Trail of Tears's Existentia (2007) and Turisas's  Battle Metal (2004), where she was the main female vocalist.

On 8 September 2016, Norwegian gothic metal band Sirenia announced that Zoldan is their new official vocalist, replacing Spanish singer Ailyn Gimenez. Previously, she had worked with that group regularly for 13 years and was part of their Sirenian Choir. She contributed with lead vocals on a cover of Leonard Cohen "First We Take Manhattan", included in the EP Sirenian Shores (2004).

Discography

With Sirenia 

 Dim Days of Dolor (2016)
Arcane Astral Aeons (2018)
 Riddles, Ruins & Revelations (2021)

As session musician

With Penumbra 
 Seclusion	(2003)

With Turisas 
 Battle Metal (2004)

With Sirenia 
 An Elixir for Existence (2004)
 Sirenian Shores (EP, 2004)	
 Nine Destinies and a Downfall	(2007)
 The 13th Floor (2009)
 The Enigma of Life (2011)
 Perils of the Deep Blue (2013)
 The Seventh Life Path	(2015)

With Trail of Tears 
 Existentia (2007)

With Mortemia 
 Misere Mortem (2010)

References

External links 
Opera concerts program at Opera Musica
Profile at Metal Archives
Discogs.com

1976 births
Living people
Musicians from Aix-en-Provence
21st-century French singers
English-language singers from France
Women heavy metal singers
Musicians from Marseille
French mezzo-sopranos
French expatriates in Norway
French session musicians
Women rock singers
21st-century French women singers